Betaimboay is a municipality in western Madagascar in Betsiboka Region approximately  north-west of the capital Antananarivo.

References

Populated places in Betsiboka